Bernd Blechschmidt is a former East German nordic combined skier who competed during the 1980s. He won a bronze medal in the 3 x 10 km team event at the 1989 FIS Nordic World Ski Championships in Lahti.

Blechschmidt's only individual career victory was in West Germany in 1981.

External links 

German male Nordic combined skiers
Living people
FIS Nordic World Ski Championships medalists in Nordic combined
East German male skiers
Year of birth missing (living people)